Courmayeur is a town and comune in northern Italy, in the autonomous region of Aosta Valley.

History
The toponym Courmayeur has been mentioned as Curia majori (1233–1381), Corte Maggiore (1620), Cormoyeu (1648), Cormaior (1680), Cormaior (Vissher, 1695), Cormaggior (L'Isle, 1707), Cormaior (Stagnoni, 1772) and Cormaieur (Martinel, 1799). The present toponym was first confirmed by Édouard Aubert (La Vallée d'Aoste, 1860), Joseph-Marie Henry (Histoire populaire de la Vallée d'Aoste, 1929) and Amé Gorret (Guide de la Vallée d'Aoste, 1877).

It became a popular tourist destination when alpinism arose, thanks to its proximity to Mont Blanc.

Under the Fascist regime and its "Italianist" rule, the town was briefly renamed Cormaiore. Courmayeur was reestablished in 1948 alongside all other French toponyms in the Aosta Valley.

The Mont Blanc Tunnel, connecting Courmayeur with Chamonix, opened in 1965, and provides an important road link between Italy and France.

In 2013, in accordance with regional law 61 (Dénomination officielle des communes de la Vallée d'Aoste et protection de la toponymie locale), a referendum was carried out to change the official name to Courmayeur-Mont-Blanc, but there was insufficient support.

Geography 
Doire baltée) river.

Courmayeur shares administration of Mont Blanc with its neighboring municipality of Saint-Gervais-les-Bains in France, and is consequently able to claim the title of highest commune in Italy.

Courmayeur also shares access to the glacial ski run of the Vallée Blanche with another French town, Chamonix, which sits at the opposite, northern, side of the Mont Blanc massif.

Main sights

Courmayeur is cited as "Italy's best all-round ski resort", and contains the Alpine Botanical Garden Saussurea, which describes itself as Europe's highest botanical garden. The Church of Saint-Pantaléon dates to the 18th century.

In the summer months Courmayeur is a popular destination for hikers.
The nearby village of La Palud is the base station of the Skyway Monte Bianco, the cable car to the Pointe Helbronner. This links to the Vallée Blanche Aerial Tramway going to the Aiguille du Midi, which connects to the Téléphérique de l'Aiguille du Midi, the cable car from Chamonix.

Notre Dame de Guérison sanctuary stands at the foot of Mont Chétif.

Sports 

 Biathlon World Championships 1959
 2011 World Junior Short Track Speed Skating Championships
 2012 Italian Figure Skating Championships
 Courmayeur Ladies Open
 Mont Blanc Trophy
 Valle d'Aosta Open

Sister cities
 Chamonix, France

References

External links

  

 
Ski areas and resorts in Italy